Velora sordida is a species of beetle in the family Cerambycidae, and the type species of its genus. It was described by Francis Polkinghorne Pascoe in 1863. It is known from Australia.

References

Lamiinae
Beetles described in 1863